Wouldham to Detling Escarpment is a  biological and geological Site of Special Scientific Interest which stretches from Wouldham to Detling, north of Maidstone in Kent. Part of it is a Geological Conservation Review site, and it is part of the North Downs Woodlands Special Area of Conservation and the Kent Downs Area of Outstanding Natural Beauty. It is a Nature Conservation Review site, Grade I and it includes three Kent Wildlife Trust nature reserves and a Local Nature Reserve,

This stretch of chalk escarpment has woodland, unimproved grassland and scrub. Plants include the nationally rare meadow clary and there are several scarce invertebrates. There are many Mesozoic fossil fishes in an excellent state of preservation.

References

Sites of Special Scientific Interest in Kent
Geological Conservation Review sites